Russ Bender (January 1, 1910 – August 16, 1969) was an American actor.

Career
Before becoming an actor, Bender wrote detective stories for magazines. That part of his life was interrupted when he joined the Army. By the time he returned to civilian life, the market for such material had decreased. At that point, he became an actor, appearing in the Gunsmoke episode “Gold Mine” (S11E15 of 1965).  Even then, he continued to write to some extent, creating script for five films as well as "numerous television scripts". He frequently appeared in b-movies, and often worked with director Maury Dexter.

Filmography
He appeared in the films

1952: Paula - Cop (uncredited)
1953: The War of the Worlds - Dr. Carmichael (uncredited)
1956: It Conquered the World - Brig. Gen. James Pattick
1957: Kelly and Me - Police Captain (uncredited)
1957: Dragstrip Girl - Police Lt. Bradley
1957: Badlands of Montana - George Johannson
1957: Beau James - Reporter (uncredited)
1957: Invasion of the Saucer Men - Doctor
1957: Man of a Thousand Faces - Divorce Judge (uncredited)
1957: The Joker Is Wild - Man in Hotel Suite (uncredited)
1957: The Amazing Colossal Man - Richard Kingman
1958: Motorcycle Gang - Lt. Joe Watson
1958: Cowboy - Joe (uncredited)
1958: Flood Tide - Surgeon (uncredited)
1958: Suicide Battalion - Sgt. Harry Donovan
1958: War of the Colossal Beast - Dr. Carmichael
1958: I Bury the Living - Henry Trowbridge (uncredited)
1958: Hot Rod Gang - Bill
1958: The Restless Years - Tom Mitchell (uncredited)
1959: No Name on the Bullet - Storekeeper
1959: Compulsion - Edgar Llewellyn - Attorney (uncredited)
1959: Ghost of Dragstrip Hollow - Tom Hendry
1959: Vice Raid - Drucker (uncredited)
1960: Walk Tall - Col. Stanton
1961: The Little Shepherd of Kingdom Come - Col. Jackson
1961: The Big Bankroll - Racetrack Official (uncredited)
1961: Anatomy of a Psycho - Frank
1961: The Purple Hills - Deputy Marshal
1961: Lover Come Back - Mr. Gates - Partner in Advertising Company (uncredited)
1962: That Touch of Mink - Williams (uncredited)
1962: Panic in Year Zero! - Harkness
1962: Air Patrol - Sgt. Lou Kurnitz
1962: Hemingway's Adventures of a Young Man - Serviceman at Train Station (uncredited)
1962: Days of Wine and Roses - (uncredited)
1963: A Gathering of Eagles - Col. Torrance
1964: The Brass Bottle - Official (uncredited)
1964: A Tiger Walks - Frightened Hunter (uncredited)
1964: The Strangler - Dr. Clarence Sanford
1964: Raiders from Beneath the Sea - Tucker
1965: The Satan Bug - Mason (uncredited)
1965: I Saw What You Did - Police Sgt. Harris
1965: Wild on the Beach - Shep Kirby
1965:Space Probe Taurus - Dr. Paul Martin
1966: The Navy vs. the Night Monsters - Chief Warr. Off. McBride
1967: Devil's Angels - Royce
1968: Maryjane - Harry Braxton
1968: Wild in the Streets - Politician at Meeting (uncredited)
1968: Live a Little, Love a Little - Editor (uncredited)
1968: The Young Animals - Coach Simms

References

External links
 

1910 births
1969 deaths
20th-century American male actors
American male film actors